Zinc finger protein 64 homolog, isoforms 1 and 2 is a protein that in humans is encoded by the ZFP64 gene.

See also
 Homolog
 Protein isoform
 Zinc finger

References

Further reading